The Clover Mountains are a mountain range in Lincoln County, Nevada.

The Clover Mountains Wilderness makes up a large part of the mountain range.

The Clover Mountains are the southern mountains on the east perimeter of the Meadow Valley Wash watershed.

References

See also 
 List of Great Basin Divide border landforms of Nevada
 Great Basin Divide

Mountain ranges of Lincoln County, Nevada
Mountain ranges of Nevada